The Wichita Falls Sailing Club is a Sailing Club located in Henrietta, Texas (United States), on the shore of Lake Arrowhead.

History 
Wichita Falls Sailing Club was founded in 1935 as Wichita Falls Yacht Club at Lake Wichita, in Wichita Falls. In 1973, the club moved to Lake Arrowhead.

Fleets 
The club was first dominated by the Snipe fleet number 34, based at the club, but in the 1960s the Windmill took over as the most popular boat. In the early 1970s, the first cabin boats, Venture 22 and 24, and in 1990 Flying Scot fleet number 170 was established at WFSC.

Sailors 
Perry Richardson Bass won the 1935 Snipe Worlds. Later on, in 1972, as navigator for Ted Turner's "American Eagle", he won the Southern Ocean Racing Circuit and the Sydney to Hobart Yacht Race.

References

External links 
 Official website

1935 establishments in Texas
Sailing in Texas
Yacht clubs in the United States